qmmp (for Qt-based MultiMedia Player) is a free and open-source cross-platform audio player that is similar to Winamp. It is written in C++ using the Qt widget toolkit for the user interface. It officially supports the operating systems Linux, FreeBSD and Microsoft Windows. In most popular Linux distributions, it is available through the standard package repositories. Until Audacious switched to Qt in version 4.0, QMMP was the only audio player to use Qt and not feature a database.

Features 

qmmp is known for its small, themeable user interface and low use of system resources. The user interface and behaviour is very similar to the at its time very popular Winamp. By supporting Winamp (Classic) skin files it can easily be configured to look exactly the same as Winamp 2.x.
It is also catering for more discerning or audiophile listeners with support for cue sheets and volume normalization according to the ReplayGain standard. Album cover art is supported using separate sidecar files or embedded in ID3v2 tags and can be automatically fetched if missing.

 A simple, intuitive user interface
 Ogg Vorbis, FLAC and MP3 music playback support
 Support for multiple artist and performer tags per song
 A notification area icon
 Plugin support
 Translations into many languages
 Equalizer

See also 

 Comparison of free software for audio#Players

References

External links
 

Free audio software
Linux media players
Free media players
Free software programmed in C++
Audio software that uses Qt